The Jägermeister Music Tour is a hard rock, hardcore punk, and heavy metal music tour that has been held twice a year in the United States since 2002. It is owned by the American importer of Jägermeister, Sidney Frank Importing.

History
First Jägermeister was started in 2002 and had Drowning Pool headlining, featuring Ill Niño, Coal Chamber, 40 Below Summer 68rouge and other local bands. The tour had 37 dates that started March 8 and went to April 23. The tour has happened twice a year since then.  Spring 2003 tour went from March 6 to April 20 and featured Saliva, Hed PE headlining, along with Breaking Benjamin, Systematic, Stereomud, 68rouge  and local bands. Fall 2003 went from October 8 to November 29 and featured Slayer Headlining with Hatebreed, Arch Enemy, and local bands.  Spring 2004 stretched from March 30 to May 14 and featured Slipknot headlining with Fear Factory, Chimaira, and local bands.  Fall 2004 went from October 31 to December 17 and featured Slayer's second headlining of this tour along with Killswitch Engage, Mastodon, and local bands such as Q. Spring 2005 went from March 29 to May 6 and featured Alter Bridge as the headlining band with Future Leaders of the World, Submersed, and local bands. In Fall 2005 the tour was headlined by Disturbed with other bands, Bloodsimple, A Dozen Furies, Corrosion of Conformity, and other local bands. This one stretched from November 11 to February 23. In the spring of 2006 the tour went from April 20 to June 16 and had Staind headlining with Three Days Grace, Hurt, and other local bands. 

The Fall 2006 tour started October 19 and went to December 9, and featured Slightly Stoopid and Pepper as headliners and multiple "guest bands" including Rev. Right Time, Kicking K8, as well as six other bands.  Beginning with the Spring 2003 tour, the event has been hosted by The Lizardman who appears onstage throughout the night performing sideshow stunts, stand-up, and introducing the bands.  This year's Fall 2008 line-up featured Hinder headlining, with Buckcherry headlining in Dallas, Trapt and Rev Theory at most shows, and Drowning Pool, In This Moment, Shinedown, Hollywood Undead, Theory of a Deadman, Puddle of Mudd, The Red Jumpsuit Apparatus and Smile Empty Soul making appearances at some shows, along with a local band from each venue's area in tow. The Spring 2009 line-up will feature longtime staples on the punk scene, Pennywise and returning to the tour are the Hawaiian grown reggae rockers Pepper. Beginning in April 2010, the Jägermeister Music Tour will embark on a Canadian leg featuring Korn as headliners, with Five Finger Death Punch and 2Cents as support. Starting in September 2010 the Music Tour will have Slayer returning as well as Megadeth and Anthrax.  In January 2011 the tour will have Buckcherry headlining with Hellyeah and direct support with All That Remains also playing.

Lineups

2002–2005
Spring 2002
Drowning Pool
Coal Chamber
Ill Niño
40 Below Summer
Unloco

Spring 2003
Saliva
Hed PE
Breaking Benjamin
Systematic
Stereomud
68rouge

Fall 2003
Slayer
Hatebreed
Arch Enemy

Spring 2004
Slipknot
Fear Factory
Chimaira

Fall 2004
Slayer
Killswitch Engage
Mastodon

Spring 2005
Alter Bridge
Future Leaders of the World
Submersed

Fall 2005
Disturbed
Corrosion of Conformity
bloodsimple
A Dozen Furies

2006–2010
Spring 2006
Staind
Three Days Grace
Hurt

Fall 2006
Slightly Stoopid
Pepper

Spring 2007
Stone Sour
Lacuna Coil
Shadows Fall
Indorphine

Fall 2007
The Cult
Action Action
The Cliks

Spring 2008
Hatebreed
Type O Negative
3 Inches of Blood

Summer 2008
Kittie
Dope
Anew Revolution
Panic Cell
Dirge (Select dates)

Fall 2008
Hinder
Trapt
Rev Theory
Octane

Spring 2009
Pennywise
Pepper
Big B

Spring 2010
Korn
Five Finger Death Punch (Canada dates only)
2Cents
StillWell
Cody Brooks (US dates only)

Fall 2010
Megadeth
Slayer
Anthrax

2011–2012

Winter 2011
Buckcherry
Hellyeah (US Dates)
All That Remains (US Dates)
The Damned Things (US Dates)
Papa Roach (Canadian Dates)
My Darkest Days (Canadian Dates)
Bleeker Ridge (Canadian Dates)

Fall 2011
Chimaira
Unearth
Skeletonwitch
Molotov Solution

2012

Fall 2012
Halestorm
In This Moment
Eve To Adam
Portugal. The Man

References

External links
Official website

Rock festivals in the United States
Concert tours
Heavy metal festivals in the United States